Mạo Khê station is a railway station in Vietnam. It serves the town of Mạo Khê, in Quảng Ninh Province.

Buildings and structures in Quảng Ninh province
Railway stations in Vietnam